Intercellular adhesion molecule 5 is a protein that in humans is encoded by the ICAM5 gene.

The protein encoded by this gene is a member of the intercellular adhesion molecule (ICAM) family. All ICAM proteins are type I transmembrane glycoproteins, contain 2-9 immunoglobulin-like C2-type domains, and bind to the leukocyte adhesion LFA-1 protein. This protein is expressed on the surface of telencephalic neurons and displays two types of adhesion activity, homophilic binding between neurons and heterophilic binding between neurons and leukocytes. It may be a critical component in neuron-microglial cell interactions in the course of normal development or as part of neurodegenerative diseases.

Interactions
ICAM5 has been shown to interact with PSEN1.

References

Further reading